Simon John Manley CMG (born 18 September 1967) is a British diplomat, now the UK Permanent Representative to the WTO and UN in Geneva and previously Ambassador to Spain from October 2013 to August 2019.

Early life 
Manley was educated at Montpelier Primary School, Latymer Upper School, Magdalen College Oxford and Yale University.

Career
Manley joined the Foreign & Commonwealth Office (FCO) in 1990. Before his posting to Madrid, he served as Director Europe at the FCO (2011-2013), responsible for policy toward the EU. He has been posted to the UK's Mission to the United Nations in New York City (1993-1998), where he worked on Yugoslavia and UN reform, and has twice been seconded to the European Union: to the European Commission (2003) and to the Council of the EU (1998-2002). 

In March 2020 Manley was appointed Director-General for COVID-19 at the Foreign & Commonwealth Office, leading and coordinating HMG's coronavirus rollout.

References

1967 births
Living people
People from Ealing
People educated at Latymer Upper School
Alumni of Magdalen College, Oxford
Yale University alumni
Ambassadors of the United Kingdom to Spain
Companions of the Order of St Michael and St George
Commanders of the Order of Merit of the Republic of Poland